Reincarnation of a Love Bird is an album by Paul Motian, released on the German JMT label in 1994. It contains performances of bebop jazz standards by Motian with the Electric Bebop Band. The album follows on from the 1992 release Paul Motian and the Electric Bebop Band, and was rereleased on the Winter & Winter label in 2005. The band features Motian with saxophonists Chris Potter and Chris Cheek, guitarists Wolfgang Muthspiel and Kurt Rosenwinkel, bass guitarist Steve Swallow and percussionist Don Alias.

Reception
The AllMusic review by Rick Anderson stated: "The element of surprise that charged the proceedings on the debut is missing this time, but this is still a very fine album overall".

Track listing
 "Split Decision" (Paul Motian) - 5:40 
 "Half-Nelson" (Miles Davis) - 3:53 
 "Ask Me Now" (Thelonious Monk) - 3:44 
 "Reincarnation of a Love Bird" (Charles Mingus) - 6:32 
 "Skippy" (Monk) - 3:40 
 "2 Bass Hit" (Dizzy Gillespie, John Lewis) - 4:10 
 Waseenonet" (Wolfgang Muthspiel) - 7:02 
 "Ornithology" (Benny Harris, Charlie Parker) - 4:31 
 "'Round Midnight" (Monk) - 6:57 
 "Be-Bop" (Gillespie) - 4:01 
 "Split Decision" (Motian) - 3:39 
Recorded at RPM Recording Studios in New York City in June 1994

Personnel
Paul Motian - drums
Chris Potter - alto saxophone (left channel)
Chris Cheek - tenor saxophone (right channel)
Wolfgang Muthspiel - electric guitar (right channel)  
Kurt Rosenwinkel - electric guitar (left channel)  
Steve Swallow - electric bass 
Don Alias - percussion

References 

1994 albums
Paul Motian albums
JMT Records albums
Winter & Winter Records albums